The Northrop JB-1A "Bat" or "Thunderbug" was a United States surface-to-surface cruise missile that was a jet-powered flying wing.

The United States Army Air Forces Jet Bomb program had its origins in August 1942 when a crashed Fi-103 better known as a V-1, was found on the Danish island of Bornholm. The Fi-103, code named Flakzielgerät-43 (FGZ-43), led to an American effort in 1943 to develop an equivalent weapon. Prior to the jet bomb program Northrop had contracted under Project MX-334 for a small rocket propelled flying wing aircraft. The MX-334 had first flown as a glider on November 9, 1943. It flew under rocket power on July 5th 1944.

Northrop formally contracted with the Army Air Force for the jet bomb MX-543 project on July 1, 1944, shortly after the Germans began their V-1 campaign against England. Progress was rapid as much design work and plans were picked up directly from the work done on MX-334. The first JB-1 was built as a manned glider to test the flight characteristics of the vehicle at lower speeds. This was a typical approach by Northrop due to its lack of a wind tunnel. The first flight of the JB-1 glider was piloted by Harry Crosby on August 27, 1944. The General Electric B-1 turbojet engine was an attempt to create a small turbojet from a B-31 turbosupercharger. The man behind it was GE Manager of Test Gene Stoeckly. Because his parents were foreign nationals he was prohibited from working on GE's secret project to adapt the Power Jets W.1 engine for American production as the GE 1-A, which was developed into the I-16. After a potential customer in the form of Northrop expressed a desire for a small turbojet, development was handed off to Russ Hall and Marty Hemsworth who managed to turn the bootstrap project into ostensibly flight worthy hardware.
The JB-1A equipped with two GE B-1 engines was ready for testing in early December 1944 at Range 64, Sana Rosa Island, Florida. On December 7th 1944 it was launched and promptly stalled and crashed. The stall was attributed to an improper elevon setting compounded by a failure of one of  the GE B-1 turbojets. The Army Air Forces Report on the failure stated "Flight failure was primarily attributted to improper setting of the bombs control surfaces prior to launching, but damage to the right turbo-jet engine approximately 30 seconds before take-off would not have permitted successful flight." The Northrop JB-1 suffered from numerous production and structural complexities as well as being overweight. The problem of persistent turbine failures coupled with the J-1s low thrust had already caused Northrop to seek another powerplant, the Ford pulse jet as used on the JB-2. That change coupled with the need to reduce the cost of manufacturing the JB-1A led to the development of the JB-10.

In June 1996, the Western Museum of Flight restored the manned JB-1 glider.

JB-10

With the successful USAAF flights of JB-2, and the inadequate performance of the GE B-1, the JB-1 program was reoriented towards pulsejet propulsion before the attempted first flight of the JB-1A. The remaining JB-1s were modified or completed as JB-10 missiles. The JB-10 was a radical redesign of the vehicle. A single PJ31-1 as was used on the JB-2 replaced the two troublesome B-1s. The explosives were buried in the wing instead of being in nacelles. Only the guidance electronics was left essentially unchanged. A new and much improved telmetry system was added. Testing of the JB-10 began in early 1945 and achieved only two partially successful flights out of 10 attempts. The longest flight of a JB-10 was only 26 miles on April 13, 1945. That short flight was ended by longitudinal instability which was a persistent problem of JB-10. The JB-10 cost $55,425 each to build while the JB-2 cost $8,620 each. As a competitor to the JB-2 the JB-10 was not a contender. The Northrop program's priority had already been reduced in November 1944. In March 1946 the JB-10 program was terminated.

References

books

 
 Mindling, George, and Bolton, Robert, U.S. Air Force Tactical Missiles 1949–1969: 'The Pioneers', 2008, Lulu Press
 
 
 
 

Cruise missiles of the United States
JB-1
1940s United States military gliders
World War II jet aircraft of the United States
World War II guided missiles of the United States
Aircraft first flown in 1944
Flying wings